Eilema angustipennis is a moth of the subfamily Arctiinae first described by Embrik Strand in 1912. It is found in Cameroon, Ghana and Uganda.

References

Moths described in 1912
angustipennis
Insects of West Africa
Moths of Africa